Max Emanuel Cenčić (born 21 September 1976) is a Croatian countertenor, as of 1994 based in Austria. He was a member of the Wiener Sängerknaben.

Early career as a boy soprano 
Born Max Emanuel Cenčić in Zagreb, he started singing at a very early age, earning fame in his native Croatia at the age of six after singing the Queen of the Night's coloratura aria "Der Hölle Rache" from Mozart's Die Zauberflöte on Zagreb television.  From circa 1987 to 1992, Cenčić was a member of the Wiener Sängerknaben, touring and recording with them.  Recorded performances, in which Cenčić was either treble soloist of the Sängerknaben or an independent male soprano, include Handel's Messiah, Haydn's Die Schöpfung, and Mozart's Requiem, alongside countertenor Derek Lee Ragin).  Cenčić can also be heard as the leading treble soloist with the Wiener Sängerknaben in numerous recordings of liturgical and secular music on the Philips label.  A particular highlight from his recordings with the Sängerknaben is a performance of the vocal version of Johann Strauss II's Frühlingsstimmen, a remarkable feat of vocalism for a boy soprano. Cenčić  was educated at Downside School in Somerset between the ages of 14 and 16.

Post-Sängerknaben career as a male soprano 
From 1992 to 1997, he pursued a solo career, singing soprano although his voice had already broken. Following considerable success as a male soprano (including widely acclaimed performances as Amore in Gluck's Orfeo ed Euridice), he took a sabbatical from performance, during which he re-trained his voice as a high countertenor.  He made his debut as a countertenor in 2001.  Prior to adapting his vocal technique to the countertenor range, Cenčić made a series of recordings of operatic arias and Lieder for a private record label.  These recordings have been sporadically available through Arcadia, the online shop of the Wiener Staatsoper.

Countertenor 
Following his re-training as a countertenor, Cenčić has enjoyed a successful career that has taken him around the world. He is noted for a series of dramatically varied portrayals, including the female role of Saint Alexis' wife (Sposa) in Stefano Landi's 1631 opera Il Sant'Alessio, with William Christie and Les Arts Florissants.  Cenčić also appeared in the role of Perseo in the serenata Andromeda Liberata, attributed to Antonio Vivaldi but of dubious authorship, both in a world tour and a recording on the DGG Archiv label with Andrea Marcon and the Venice Baroque Orchestra.

Cencic made his debut at the Vienna State Opera on 28 February 2010, in the role of the Herold in the premiere of Aribert Reimann's opera Medea. He sang three additional performances of the role at the Staatsoper in November and December 2010.

A studio recording of operatic arias by George Frideric Handel, notably containing music composed for the mezzo-soprano castrato Giovanni Carestini, was released on the EMI/Virgin label in the UK on 1 March 2010.  In 2015 Decca released a recording by Parnassus Arts Productions of Leonardo Vinci's Catone in Utica co-produced by Cenčić, in which he sang the role of Arbace.

Cencic appeared as Nerone in Monteverdi's L'incoronazione di Poppea for the Opéra de Lille in 2012, with Sonya Yoncheva as Poppea, Tim Mead as Ottone and Emanuelle Haïm conducting Le Concert d’Astrée. In 2017, he performed the same role in the production for the reopening of the Staatsoper Unter den Linden in Berlin, staged by Eva Höckmayr, conducted by Diego Fasolis, alongside Anna Prohaska as Poppea. He has also staged operas, notably Handel's Arminio, in which he also played the title role, at the Badisches Staatstheater Karlsruhe in 2016

Discography 
Albums
 Porpora: Opera Arias. Armonia Atenea, George Petrou, Decca, 2018
 Porpora: Germanico in Germania Julia Lezhneva, Capella Cracoviensis, Jan Tomasz Adamus, Decca, 2018
 Handel; Ottone Max Emanuel Cencic, Pavel Kudinov, Lauren Snouffer, Ann Hallenberg, Anna Starushkevych, Il Pomo d'Oro, George Petrou, Decca, 2017
 Handel: Arminio, Max Emanuel Cencic, Layla Claire, Ruxandra Donose, Vince Yi, Juan Sancho, Xavier Sabata, Petros Magoulas, Armonia Atenea, George Petrou, Decca, 2017
 Arie Napoletane, Il Pomo D'Oro, Maxim Emelyanychev, Decca, 2015
 Leonardo Vinci: Catone in Utica, Decca, 2015
 The 5 Countertenors, Max Emanuel Cencic, Yuriy Mynenko, Xavier Sabata, Vince Yi, Valer Barna-Sabadus, Armonia Atenea, George Petrou, Decca, 2015
 Gluck: Orfeo ed Euridice (1762), Max Emanuel Cencic, Malin Hartelius, Franco Fagioli, Emmanuelle de Negri, Insula Orchestra, Laurence Equilbey, Archiv, 2015
 Hasse: Siroe, Julia Lezhneva, Mary-Ellen Nesi, Franco Faglioli, Armonia Atenea, George Petrou, Decca, 2014
 Handel: Tamerlano, Xavier Sabata, Max Emanuel Cencic, John Mark Ainsley, Karina Gauvin, Ruxandra Donose, Il Pomo d'Oro, Riccardo Minasi, Naive Classique, 2014
 Rokoko, arias, Armonia Atenea, George Petrou, Decca, 2014
 Venezia, Il Pomo d'oro, Riccardo Minasi Virgin, 2013
 Vinci: Artaserse, Philippe Jaroussky, Max Emanuel Cencic, Valer Barna-Sabadus, Franco Fagioli, Concerto Köln, Diego Fasolis, Virgin, 2012
 Handel: Alessandro, Karina Gauvin, Julia Lezhneva, Armonia Aeterna, George Petrou, Decca, 2012
 Vivaldi, Scarlatti, Caldara: Cantatas, compilation box 3CD Capriccio, 2012
 Gluck: Ezio 1750 version, Topi Lehtipuu, Sonia Prina, Ann Hallenberg, Julian Pregardien, Mayuko Karasawa, Il Complesso Barocco, Alan Curtis, Virgin, 2011
 Duetti, Philippe Jaroussky William Christie, Virgin, 2011
 Vivaldi: Farnace, Max Emanuel Cencic, Ruxandra Donose, Mary-Ellen Nesi, Ann Hallenberg, Karina Gauvin, Daniel Behle, Emiliano Gonzalez Toro, I Barocchisti, Diego Fasolis, Virgin, 2011
 Handel: Mezzo-Soprano Opera Arias, I Barocchisti, Diego Fasolis, Virgin, 2010
 Handel: Faramondo, Philippe Jaroussky, Sophie Karthäuser, Choeur de la Radio Suisse, I Barocchisti, Diego Fasolis, Virgin, 2009
 Handel: Rodrigo, Al Ayre Espanol Eduardo Lopez Banzo, Ambroisie 2008
 Rossini: Opera Arias & Ouvertures, Michael Hofstetter, Virgin, 2008
 Handel: Fernando (Sosarme), Il Complesso Barocco, Alan Curtis, Virgin, 2007
 Domenico Scarlatti: Scarlatti Cantatas Vol. 2, Harpsichord: Aline Zylberajch, Lute and Gitarre: Yasunori Imamura, Cello: Maya Amrein Capriccio, 2006
 Gluck: Ezio (1750), Max Emanuel Cencic, Matthias Rexroth, Neue Düsseldorfer Hofmusik, Andreas Stoehr, Coviello, 2006
 Caldara: Caldara Cantatas, Capriccio, 2005
 Vivaldi and others: Andromeda Liberata, Andrea Marcon, Archiv, 2004
 The Vivaldi Album, Karsten Erik Ose, Capriccio, 2004
 Domenico Scarlatti: Cantate d'amore, Karsten Erik Ose, Capriccio, 2003
DVD
 Handel: Arminio, Max Emanuel Cencic, Juan Sancho, Lauren Snouffer, Owen Willetts, Aleksandra Kubas-Kruk, Gaia Petrone, Armonia Atenea, George Petrou, Karlsruhe, CMajor, 2017
 Vinci: Artaserse, Philippe Jaroussky, Max Emanuel Cencic, Valer Barna-Sabadus, Franco Fagioli, Concerto Köln, Diego Fasolis, Warner Music Group Germany, 2012
 Monteverdi: L'incoronazione di Poppea, Philippe Jaroussky (Nerone), Danielle de Niese (Poppea), Anna Bonitatibus (Ottavia), Max Emanuel Cencic (Ottone), Les Arts Florissants, William Christie, Virgin, 2012
 Monteverdi: L'incoronazione di Poppea, Sonya Yoncheva (Poppée), Max Emanuel Cencic (Néron), Ann Hallenberg (Octavie), Tim Mead (Othon), Paul Whelan (Sénèque) & Amel Brahim-Djelloul (Drusilla), Le Concert d'Astrée, Emmanuelle Haïm (conductor) & Jean-François Sivadier (stage director), Virgin, 2013
 Stefano Landi: Il Sant' Alessio, Philippe Jaroussky, Max Emanuel Cencic, Alain Buet, Xavier Sabata, Damien Guillon, Pascal Bertin, Terry Wey, Les Arts Florissants, William Christie, Virgin, 2007

References

External links
 
 Website of Parnassus Arts Productions
 Partial Discography (excludes recordings made with the Sängerknaben and as a boy soprano)
 Profile of Max Emanuel Cencic on the website of his French management firm, Concerts Parisiens

1976 births
Living people
21st-century Croatian male opera singers
Operatic countertenors
Musicians from Zagreb
Croatian expatriates in Austria
Performers of early music
21st-century Austrian male opera singers
20th-century Croatian male opera singers
20th-century Austrian male opera singers